Lavorel is a surname. Notable people with the surname include:
 Henri Lavorel (1914–1955), French film director
 Sandra Lavorel (born 1965), French ecologist

French-language surnames